Poiana Stampei is a commune located in Suceava County, southern Bukovina, northeastern Romania. It is composed of seven villages, namely: Căsoi, Dornișoara, Pilugani, Poiana Stampei, Prăleni, Tătaru, and Teșna. Crossed by European route E58, it is located on the old border between Moldavia and Transylvania, on the southern ridges of the historical region of Bukovina. Poiana Stampei was first mentioned in documents in 1593, during the reign of Moldavian Prince Aaron the Tyrant.

Gallery

References 

Communes in Suceava County
Localities in Southern Bukovina